GRD or Grd may refer to:

Economics and commerce 
 Global depository receipt
 Global resources dividend
 Greek drachma, the former currency of Greece

Places 
 German Democratic Republic
 Grenada

Transportation 
 Giridih railway station, in Jharkhand, India
 Greenwood County Airport, in South Carolina, United States
 Group Racing Developments, a British racing car manufacturer

Other uses 
 Game Research/Design, a defunct American game publisher
 Gastroesophageal reflux disease
 Glasgow Roller Derby, in Scotland
 Gradian, a unit of angular measurement
 Grdeša (–1180), Serbian noble
 GRD Limited, an Australian holding company
 Guruntum language, spoken in Nigeria